A volute is a spiral, scroll-like ornament that forms the basis of the Ionic order, found in the capital of the Ionic column.

Volute may also refer to:

Science and technology
 Volutidae (common name volutes), a taxonomic family of predatory sea snails 
 Volute (pump), the casing in a centrifugal pump
 Volute spring, a compression spring in the form of a cone

Other uses
 Volute, a spiral or scroll form in the arabesque form of artistic decoration
 Volute,  a handrail for a bullnose step that is shaped like a spiral; See Stairs
 Volute krater, a type of Greek urn
 Volute, a scroll shaped carving at the tuning head of stringed musical instruments